21_21 Design Sight is a museum in Roppongi in Minato, Tokyo, Japan, which opened in 2007. The museum, a design museum, was created by architect Tadao Ando and fashion designer Issey Miyake. "The idea was to create not only a museum that shows exhibits," says Ando, "but also a place for researching the potentiality of design as an element that enriches our daily life, a place that fosters the public's interest in design by arousing in them different sights and perspectives on how we can view the world and the objects surrounding us." The building, designed by Ando, is on the edge of the park area, and features 1,700 square meters (18,300 sq ft) of floor space, including two galleries and an attached cafe run by chef and restaurateur Takamasa Uetake. The split-level concrete structure includes a hand-sanded steel roof (whose design was inspired by Issey Miyake's A-POC ("A Piece of Cloth") concept) and 14-meter (46 ft) long glass panels.

The current directors are Japanese designers Issey Miyake, Taku Satoh, and Naoto Fukasawa.

References

External links
 

Art museums and galleries in Tokyo
Roppongi
Design museums
2007 establishments in Japan
Art museums established in 2007
Tadao Ando buildings
Buildings and structures in Minato, Tokyo